Bulandet is an archipelago in the sea off the mainland coast of Western Norway. The island group is part of Askvoll Municipality in Vestland county, Norway. The islands of Værlandet and Alden lie immediately east of Bulandet.

Bulandet is Norway's westernmost fishing village with a fish packing plant that has freezing and cooling systems.  Bulandet Chapel is located at Kjempeneset on one of the main islands.  The islands are connected to nearby Værlandet island by a series of bridges and roads.  There is a regular ferry stop at Værlandet, connecting all of these islands to the mainland village of Askvoll.

During World War II, Bulandet was used as a port for sailings between Norway, Shetland, and Scotland.  The settlement at Bulandet was ravaged by punitive German attacks.

See also
List of islands of Norway

References

External links
NRK-Norwegian Broadcasting Corporation slideshow
How to get there, community council site with English version

Islands of Vestland
Askvoll